The Chief of the Air Staff (CAS) is the professional head of the Royal Air Force and a member of both the Chiefs of Staff Committee and the Air Force Board. The post was created in 1918 with Major General Sir Hugh Trenchard as the first incumbent. The current and 30th Chief of the Air Staff is Air Chief Marshal Sir Michael Wigston, who succeeded Sir Stephen Hillier in July 2019.

History
The post of Chief of the Air Staff (CAS) was established in January 1918, just prior to the official formation of the Royal Air Force (RAF), and its first occupant was Major General Sir Hugh Trenchard. Following Trenchard's resignation in March 1918 after disagreements with the first air minister, Lord Rothermere, his rival Major General Sir Frederick Sykes was appointed. For political reasons Trenchard's resignation did not take effect until late April in order that he would be CAS when the RAF was formed. With Winston Churchill's post-war appointment as Secretary of State for War and Air, Sykes was moved sideways to head up the nascent Civil Aviation ministry and Trenchard returned as CAS. In the early 1920s, Trenchard had to fight to keep the RAF from being divided and absorbed back into the Royal Navy and the British Army. After Lord Trenchard retired in 1930 there were still suggestions that the RAF should be broken up, but Trenchard's foundations proved solid.

By the time the Second World War broke out in 1939, the then occupant of the post, Air Chief Marshal Sir Cyril Newall, had a service that had been undergoing the most rapid of expansions during the British rearmament programs of the late 1930s. Newall gave way in 1940 to Air Chief Marshal Sir Charles Portal, who led the service for the rest of the war. Portal was a tireless defender of the RAF and highly capable in administration and strategy. Postwar the RAF was reoriented to perform the dual roles of defending the shrinking British Empire and possibly fighting against the Soviet Union in a Warsaw Pact verses NATO war over Germany and the United Kingdom. The Chiefs of the Air Staff of the day had to fight a constant battle to keep the British aircraft industry alive. In the end only minimal success was achieved, with only a rump aviation industrial base left by the 1970s.

The first eight Chiefs of the Air Staff were originally commissioned in the British Army, with four coming from the infantry, two from the artillery and one each from the cavalry and the engineers. Of these both Lord Trenchard and Sir John Salmond each held the post over two separate periods. By the early mid-1950s sufficient time had elapsed for officers originally commissioned in the British air services of the First World War to have risen through the ranks to RAF's senior post; Sir John Slessor had originally served in the Royal Flying Corps while Sir William Dickson was commissioned into the Royal Naval Air Service. In 1956 Sir Dermot Boyle became the first CAS to have originally been commissioned in the RAF.

Appointees
The following list gives details of the chiefs of the air staff from 1918 to the present:

  The ranks and titles shown are the highest that the officer in question attained during his tour as Chief of the Air Staff. However, in the case where the officer was promoted on the day before he was posted or retired, then the lower rank is shown.

See also

Other service chiefs
Chief of the Defence Staff (United Kingdom)
First Sea Lord / Chief of the Naval Staff
Chief of the General Staff (United Kingdom)
Chief of Air Force (Australia)  (Between 1922 and 1997, the RAAF's senior officer was known as "Chief of the Air Staff".) 
Chief of the Air Staff (disambiguation)

Generally relevant
CAS Air Power Workshop

References

 *
United Kingdom